Patricia Obdulia de Jesús Castillo Romero (born 6 March 1963) is a Mexican politician from the Citizens' Movement. From 2006 to 2009 she served as Deputy of the LX Legislature of the Mexican Congress representing Nayarit.

References

1963 births
Living people
Politicians from Nayarit
Women members of the Chamber of Deputies (Mexico)
Citizens' Movement (Mexico) politicians
21st-century Mexican politicians
21st-century Mexican women politicians
Autonomous University of Nayarit alumni
Members of the Congress of Nayarit
Deputies of the LX Legislature of Mexico
Members of the Chamber of Deputies (Mexico) for Nayarit